Harald 'Harry' Neuwirth (born 2 February 1939) is an Austrian jazz pianist and composer.

Life and career 
Born in Vienna, Neuwirth comes from a musical family; the composer Gösta Neuwirth is his brother, the composer Olga Neuwirth his daughter. At the age of twelve he was already performing piano concertos by Mozart; he remained faithful to classical music until the age of 18, when he turned to jazz and became a jazz pianist. He initially studied law (until graduation). He also studied classical piano at the Salzburg Mozarteum and the Graz Conservatory.

Since its foundation in 1965, Neuwirth has taught at the Institute for Jazz at the then University of Music and Performing Arts Graz, (now University of Music), where he was department head from 1975 to 1983. He is regarded as the "architect" of the Graz jazz education. In 1981 he was appointed full professor. He was a founding member of the sextet of Erich Kleinschuster, led his own ensembles and composed or arranged film and theatre music.

Discography 
 Grazer Messen im Jazzstil (1980)
 Jazz Piano Austria vol. 1 (2013, with Martin Reiter, Erwin Schmidt, Oliver Kent, Gerald Schuller, Sava Miletic and Philippine Duchateau)

Further reading 
 Alexander Rausch: Neuwirth, Harald. In Oesterreichisches Musiklexikon. Online- edition, Vienna 2002 ff., ; Printed edition: volume 3, Austrian Academy of Sciences publishing House, Vienna 2004, .
 Michael Kahr: Jazz & the City. Jazz in Graz von 1965 bis 2015 (Graz: Leykam 2016), .

External links

References 

Austrian jazz pianists
Austrian jazz composers
Austrian film score composers
1939 births
Living people
Musicians from Vienna
Eurovision Song Contest conductors